Babin is a surname. Notable people with the name include:

 Brian Babin (born 1948), American dentist and politician from Texas
 Éric Babin (1959–2021) is a New Caledonian politician
 Gustave Babin (1865–1939), French journalist
 Jason Babin (born 1980), American football outside linebacker
 Jean-Sylvain Babin (born 1986), Martiniquais football defender
 Lucas Babin (born 1979), American film and television actor
 Magali Babin (born 1967), Canadian musician, composer and performance artist
 María Teresa Babín Cortés (1910–1989), Puerto Rican educator, literary critic, and essayist whose father was born in the French insular region of Guadeloupe
 Mitch Babin (born 1954), Canadian ice hockey player
 Nicolas Babin (born 1966), French businessman
 Peggy Babin (born 1976), French athlete 
 Rex Babin (1962–2012), American political cartoonist
 Sergei Babin, Russian police officer
 Stanley Babin (1932–2010), Latvian composer and pianist
 Victor Babin (1908–1972), half of the Russian piano duo Vronsky & Babin